Public education in Fort Lauderdale is served by Broward County Public Schools. BCPS operates sixteen elementary schools, four middle schools, and three high schools within the city limits.

Public elementary schools
Bayview Elementary School
Bennett Elementary School
Croissant Park Elementary School
Dillard Elementary School
Stephen Foster Elementary School
Harbordale Elementary School
Lauderdale Manors Elementary School
Thurgood Marshall Elementary School
North Fork Elementary School
North Side Elementary School
Riverland Elementary School
Rock Island Elementary School
Sunland Park Elementary School
Walker Elementary School
Westwood Heights Elementary School
Virginia Shuman Young Elementary School

Public middle schools
William Dandy Middle School
New River Middle School
Sunrise Middle School
James S Rickards middle
Parkway Middle School

Public high schools
Dillard High School
Fort Lauderdale High School
Northeast High School
Stranahan High School
Sheridan Technical High School

Other public schools that serve Fort Lauderdale students
Several schools outside the city limits have attendance areas that include portions of the city of Fort Lauderdale. Boyd H. Anderson High School in Lauderdale Lakes, Northeast High School in Oakland Park, South Plantation High School in Plantation, and Nova High School in Davie are four public high schools outside the city limits that serve students who live within.

Martin Luther King Jr. Elementary School and Meadowbrook Elementary School are two elementary schools that fall into the same category, though they are located in unincorporated areas.

Private schools
A few private schools located within the city of Fort Lauderdale are:
University School of Nova Southeastern University
Pine Crest School
Cardinal Gibbons High School
Westminster Academy
St. Thomas Aquinas High School
Calvary Christian School
Saint Anthony Catholic School
Saint Coleman Catholic School

Education in Fort Lauderdale, Florida
 
Fort Lauderdale